Leonardo Matias Baiersdorf Linck (born 3 March 2001), known as Léo Linck, is a Brazilian footballer who plays as a goalkeeper for Athletico Paranaense.

Club career
Born in Marechal Cândido Rondon but raised in Toledo, both in the Paraná state, Léo Linck joined Athletico Paranaense's youth setup in March 2015, from Craques do Futuro, a team based in Foz do Iguaçu. On 26 May 2021, he renewed his contract until December 2024.

Promoted to the under-23 team ahead of the 2022 season, Léo Link made his professional debut on 6 March 2022, starting in a 4–3 Campeonato Paranaense away win over FC Cascavel, as Anderson was suspended.

Career statistics

Honours
Athletico Paranaense
Copa Sudamericana: 2021

References

External links
Athletico Paranaense profile 

2001 births
Living people
Sportspeople from Paraná (state)
Brazilian footballers
Association football goalkeepers
Campeonato Paranaense players
Club Athletico Paranaense players